The Ungovernable Force is an album by the British punk rock band Conflict. It was released in 1986 by Mortarhate Records.

Considered by many in the punk rock community to be the band's most coherent and complete representation of their politics and aesthetic, it has become an enduring classic in anarchist punk music culture.

Track listing
 "You Cannot Win" – 3:17
 "The Ungovernable Farce" – 1:27
 "A Piss In The Ocean" – 2:03
 "C.R.A.S.S." – 1:25
 "Custom Rock" – 1:51
 "1986, The Battle Continues" – 0:59
 "Mental Mania" – 2:00
 "The Ungovernable Force" – 3:21
 "They Said That..." – 2:15
 "Force or Service" – 2:09
 "The Arrest" – 1:16
 "Statement" – 2:10
 "The Day Before" – 2:10
 "This Is The A.L.F." – 2:47
 "To Be Continued..." – 3:03
 "Mighty And Superior" – 3:49
 "To Whom It May Concern" – 3:16
 "This Is The A.L.F. [Remix]" – 2:48
 "This Is The A.L.F. [Remix]" – 2:47
 "Custom Rock" – 1:49
 "Statement" – 2:10
 "Hidden Track" – 1:56

Personnel
 Colin - vocals
 Paco - drums
 Kevin - guitar
 Paul - bass guitar
 Steve - vocals
 Mandy - vocals

References

Conflict (band) albums
1986 albums
Albums recorded at Rockfield Studios